The Jaguari Mirim River is a river of São Paulo state in southeastern Brazil. It is a tributary of the Moji-Guaçu River.

See also
List of rivers of São Paulo

Notes

References
 

Rivers of São Paulo (state)